The Penance and the Patience is the debut EP by Australian rock band Closure in Moscow, released on 18 April 2008 through Taperjean Records. The band advertised the EP as an albumette.

The EP was originally only released in Australia, New Zealand and Japan through Taperjean Records. It was also available for import to overseas countries through Fist2Face, and through the iTunes Store as a worldwide digital download. The EP debuted at #13 on the Australian Independent Record (AIR) album charts. It has received over one million MySpace plays and earned the band a mention in Alternative Press, as one of the "100 Bands You Need to Know in 2009".

The EP was released on vinyl in August 2021, when it re-entered the AIR chart, peaking at number 4.

Reception

Track listing

Personnel

Closure in Moscow
 Michael Barrett – guitar
 Christopher James deCinque – lead vocals
 Brad Kimber – bass guitar
 Beau McKee – drums
 Mansur Zennelli – guitar, vocals

Additional musicians
 Angelina Morino – lead vocals (tracks 3, 5)

Recording and art work
 Recorded – Kris Crummett at Sing Sing Studios, Melbourne
 Produced – Kris Crummett, Closure in Moscow
 Engineered – Kris Crummett, Ben Eherensburg
 Mixed and mastered – Kris Crummett, at Interlace Audio Recording Studios, Portland, Oregon
 Illustration – Joel Melrose
 Art design and layout – Synapse Design

Charts

References

Closure in Moscow albums
2008 EPs